Heike Baehrens (born 21 September 1955) is a German deaconess, religious educator and politician (SPD). Since the federal election in 2013, she is a member of the German Bundestag.

Early life and career
After training as a bank clerk, she studied religious education. She worked as a deaconess in various church fields from 1977 to 1985. From 1996 to 2013 she has been managing director of the Diakonisches Werk Württemberg, and from 2002 to 2013 a member of the full-time board of directors of social policy fields and deputy chairman of the board. As a church councilor, she was a deputy to Dieter Kaufmann in the college of the Upper Church Council of the Evangelical-Lutheran Church in Württemberg.

Political career

Career in local politics
Baehrens joined the SPD in 1988. From 1989 to 1996 she was a member of the Stuttgart municipal council. There she was first youth and social policy spokeswoman for the SPD group. From 1992 to 1996 she was deputy chairman of the SPD group in the Stuttgart municipal council.

Member of Parliament, 2013–present
In the 2013 federal elections, Baehrens moved to the German Bundestag via the SPD state list Baden-Württemberg for the Bundestag constituency Göppingen. She has since been a full member of the Bundestag Committee on Health, where she is her parliamentary group's rapporteur on inclusion and European affairs. Since 2018, she has also been serving as chairwoman of its Sub-Committee on Global Health.

In addition to her committee assignments, Baehrens serves as Deputy Chairwoman of the German-Korean Parliamentary Group as well as Deputy Speaker of the Baden-Württemberg State Group of the SPD parliamentary group. She is a member of the non-partisan Europa-Union Deutschland, which is committed to a federal Europe and a far-reaching European unification process.

Since the 2021 elections, Baehrens has been serving as his parliamentary group's spokesperson for health. Amid the COVID-19 pandemic in Germany, she joined forces with six other parliamentarians – Dirk Wiese, Dagmar Schmidt, Janosch Dahmen, Till Steffen, Katrin Helling-Plahr and Marie-Agnes Strack-Zimmermann – on a cross-party initiative in 2022 to support legislation that would require all adults to be vaccinated.

Other activities
 German Network against Neglected Tropical Diseases (DNTDs), Member of the Parliamentary Advisory Board (since 2018)
 Berliner Republik, Member of the Editorial Board
 Evangelical Church in Germany (EKD), Member of the Committee on the Social Order
 VfB Stuttgart, Member

Personal life
Baehrens is married since 1977 and has two adult daughters and three grandchildren.

References

External links
Official website

Members of the Bundestag for Baden-Württemberg
Living people
1955 births
People from Holzminden (district)
Female members of the Bundestag
Members of the Bundestag 2021–2025
Members of the Bundestag 2017–2021
Members of the Bundestag 2013–2017
Members of the Bundestag for the Social Democratic Party of Germany
21st-century German women politicians